Robert Grant (August 22, 1854 – January 24, 1935) was a lumberman and political figure in British Columbia. He represented Comox from 1903 to 1909 in the Legislative Assembly of British Columbia as a Conservative.

He was born in Pictou, Nova Scotia, the son of Hugh Grant and Nancy Harris, and was educated there. In 1880, he married Barbara Jane McCutcheon. Grant served as mayor of Cumberland from 1902 to 1903. Grant built and operated a sawmill in Cumberland in partnership with Lewis Mounce.

He died in 1935.

References 

1854 births
1935 deaths
British Columbia Conservative Party MLAs
Mayors of places in British Columbia